The Right Honourable Lord Provost of Edinburgh is the convener of the City of Edinburgh local authority. They are elected by the city council and serve not only as the chair of that body, but as a figurehead for the entire city. They are also ex officio the Lord-Lieutenant of Edinburgh. They are equivalent in many ways to the institution of Mayor that exists in many other countries.

While some of Scotland's local authorities elect a Provost, only the four main cities (Edinburgh, Glasgow, Aberdeen and Dundee) have a Lord Provost. In Edinburgh this position dates from 1667, when Charles II elevated the Provost to the status of Lord Provost, with the same rank and precedence as the Lord Mayor of London. The title of Lord Provost is enshrined in the Local Government etc. (Scotland) Act 1994.

The current Lord Provost

In total, there have been 256 Provosts and Lord Provosts.

The current Lord Provost is Robert Aldridge.

Past provosts of Edinburgh

The first named individual overseeing Edinburgh was William de Dederyk, in 1296, who is described as an alderman. The second named alderman is John Wigmer in 1344. This is followed by William Guppeld, 1362–1369, and Sir Adam Forrester of Corstorphine in 1373.

14th century

(1377) John de Quhitness (John of Whiteness) first use of the term "Provost" on 18 May 1377
(1378) Sir Adam Forrester (see above)
(1381) John de Camera (John of Chambers)
(1387) Andrew Yutson or Yichtson
(1392) John of Dalrymple

The following decade includes a period with mention only of Baillies.

15th century

16th century

17th century

Lord Provosts of Edinburgh

18th century

19th century

20th century

21st century
2003 Lesley Hinds  (Labour)
2007 George Grubb  (Liberal Democrat) 
2012 Donald Wilson (Labour) 
2017 Frank Ross (Scottish National Party) 
2022 Robert Aldridge (Liberal Democrat)

References

Notes

Sources

External links

Politics of Edinburgh
Edinburgh, Lord Provost of
Government of Scotland
 
 
Edinburgh-related lists